The Villa of Domitian, known as Albanum Domitiani or Albanum Caesari in Latin, was a vast and sumptuous Roman villa or palace built by Emperor Titus Flavius Domitian (81–96 AD). It was situated  outside Rome, in the Alban Hills, in the ancient territory of Ager Albanus (from the legendary Latin city of Alba Longa).

Today the remains of the villa are located mostly within the estate of the Pontifical Villas of Castel Gandolfo, and the rest in the towns of Castel Gandolfo and Albano Laziale. The Villa Barberini gardens are open to visitors.

History
The legendary capital of the Latin League, Alba Longa, was believed to have been founded by the son of Aeneas, Ascanius, around the ancient volcanic crater filled by Lake Albano. But there is no agreement among scholars about the exact location of the ancient city and no archaeological traces.

Alba Longa was completely destroyed in the 6th c. BC, and Latium vetus annexed to Rome. With progressive Roman expansion, the Alban Hills became home to numerous patrician suburban villas. In particular the remains of two large villas on the Via Appia Antica, one attributed to Publius Clodius Pulcher and the other to Pompey have been found. In addition various Republican-era villas nestled on the banks of the lake and beyond. All these properties eventually became, in one way or another, imperial property: by the time of Augustus, the extraordinary concentration of villas gave birth to the term Albanum Caesari.

The first imperial villa estate here was inhabited by Tiberius, then Caligula and Nero.

The works of Domitian

The first emperors probably contented themselves to live in the most sumptuous existing villas, namely that of Clodius in Herculanum (today in the garden of the Villa Santa Caterina of the Pontifical North American College) and that of Pompeo Albano (now in the municipal public park of Villa Doria).

Domitian, who settled there on a permanent basis, decided to build a new main complex to the villa in the most panoramic position towards both the sea and the lake, and featuring lavish new structures such as a racecourse and theatre. Probably the project was entrusted to Rabirius, architect of the Palace of Domitian on the Palatine.

The villa came to occupy  according to the calculations of Giuseppe Lugli.

Martial mentions the villa as one of Domitian's favoured resorts. Suetonius says Domitian had a passion for archery which he practised there and Pliny suggests he held boating parties on the lake.

On the death of Domitian the villa was rarely used by his imperial successors. Some modifications are dated to the second century and in particular to the eras of Trajan and Hadrian. Therefore, it is not unlikely that the emperor Hadrian stayed there waiting for the completion of his Villa Adriana in Tivoli, while Marcus Aurelius lived there a few days using the villa as a refuge during the riots that took place in 175 AD.

Description

The villa was built on the rim of the ancient volcanic crater filled by Lake Albano (between 100,000 and 5,000 years ago).

For this reason, given the uneven ground, the villa was built on three terraces. The terrace structure is not uncommon for Roman villas in the hills: for example the nearby villa in Frascati, the so-called villa of Lucullus, later belonging to Flavia gens, built in terraces on the slope of Tusculum facing Rome: the vast terrace now houses virtually all the historic centre of Frascati.

A fourth (highest) level lies on the plane of the Appian Way. The palace proper stood on the third terrace from the top, in the present church of St. Francis of Assisi and the adjoining building of Propaganda Fide. North of it there was the second terrace, which had a panoramic view of the lake (east) and the sea (west). Finally, on the lower terrace were the Hippodrome and the entrances to the villa. There are also isolated structures connected with the Domitian Villa: the nymphaeum and the docks on the lake shore, the hillside terrace, cisterns and the three aqueducts from Palazzolo, the access road network, the nymphaeum of the Rotunda in the centre of Albano converted into a Catholic church. It was also felt until the beginning of the twentieth century that the Albano Roman amphitheatre was connected to the villa.

Today it is not possible to calculate precisely the extent of the imperial properties in this area which certainly included most of today's municipalities of Castel Gandolfo and Albano Laziale. Quite possibly it extended north to at least Bovillae (XIII milestone of Appia Antica), in the south up to Aricia (XVI mile). Also the villa attributed to Pompey was incorporated, the remains of which are now included within the residential area of Villa Doria at Albano.

Other remains of a villa of Tiberian age, but inhabited until the fifth century, have been found to the southwest in Cavallacci, at the ring road of Albano. To the east, however, probably the imperial possessions included the entire Lake Albano with the many villas built in the Republican era on the crater (the so-called Augusto Palazzolo, one attributed to Seneca not far away, and others between Marino and Castel Gandolfo). It is not impossible that even the lake of Nemi was part of Albanum Caesare, as Julius Caesar had built a villa in the area, identified as remains at Monte Gentile.

In the opinion of Lugli under Domitian the various villas in the imperial property were brought together in one single property.

The palace
The palace had three stories, as shown by the remains of a staircase seen from Lugli. All the walls are made of brickwork reinforced every 80 cm: it does not appear to have used opus reticulatum suggesting a 1st c. AD or later date.

The complete reconstruction of the building plan was made by Pietro Rosa. The building was structured around three courtyards, called "atria" by Rosa. This feature allowed Lugli to recognise the analogy with the complex of Domitian's palace on the Palatine in Rome. It was based on three open spaces: triclinium, peristyle and tablinum.

The baths were recognised thanks to the abundance of clay pipes etc. The spa area is located in the righthand central atrium, probably the ancient peristyle.

The second level

Lakeview terrace

A hundred metres from the palace in one of the nineteenth-century villas are the remains of a terrace overlooking the lake. Only two walls of substructure are spaced from one another by 15 m. The fact that these structures are in opus reticulatum suggests that this is an early villa, dating from the late Republican era, embedded in the structure of the later villa. Probably between the two walls was a road leading down to the lake shore.

The lakeside terrace is accessed through a tunnel dug into the lava rock, cyclopean work whose only purpose was to allow the emperor to climb the gentle slope of the hill to see the lake below. In 1910 the tunnel was cleared from the earth that had filled over the centuries, but since it ended outside the papal property it was closed at the villa Barberini wall.

The tunnel is 100 m long and has a single skylight, around the middle. The height of the entrance on the side of Villa Barberini is 2.40 m. The outlet on the side of the lake below was tracked down by Lugli in the wall of the terrace which includes a large brickwork arch 3.75 m wide.

The Avenue of the Nymphaea
This construction is connected to the theatre by a long north-south avenue with four side niches identified by archaeologists as nymphaea.

The first nymphaeum from the south is rectangular, 6.20 m deep and has thirteen niches in the walls; the second and the fourth, semicircular, are 2.60 m and 6.85 m wide and have seven niches; the third, rectangular, is 5.50 m with thirteen niches, like the first.

In some places wall plaster remains (often 3 cm thick) and even, at least at the time of Lugli, traces of colour.

The Cryptoporticus

The cryptoporticus was used to build up and support the front of the terrace above which ran the avenue of the nymphaea and forecourt of the theatre. Although now very truncated it still has a length of 120 m. At 7.45 m wide, it is probably the largest known cryptoporticus in any villa around Rome,  certainly dwarfing any of those of the Villa Adriana at Tivoli.

The vaulted ceiling was coffered in stucco of which few traces remain. The east side is carved in part from the rock itself, while the west is pierced by windows providing light: Lugli noted with admiration how each window corresponds to a niche on the other side. At the north end was the statue of Polyphemus found in the Bergantino nymphaeum on the shore of the lake.

Various access routes from the Appian Way to the villa converged towards this cryptoporticus and therefore it was a sort of long covered entrance.

The theatre

The theatre is one of the most significant buildings of the villa, with its extraordinary relief panels in the hall of the auditorium. It is the only building to be investigated recently.

The auditorium was built against the hill, while the orchestra and the stage were on the floor of the second terrace. It was built according to all the criteria of the acoustics of the time, pointing to the west to avoid the interference of the turbulent winds of the north and south. The orchestra's radius to the first seat was of 5.90 m, just 20 Roman feet: therefore Lugli was able to calculate that the total radius of the semicircle of the theatre was 25 m.

The first excavation of the theatre was in 1657 by Leonardo Agostini for Cardinal Barberini. Lugli began studying theatre in 1914 and adjourned his studies in 1918 after the refurbishment of the Villa Barberini brought to light other ruins; in particular, another part of the auditorium hall with other stucco panels was discovered in 1917.

The theatre is notable for stucco decorations in perspective, similar to painting of the fourth style. It is a frieze consisting of thirteen panels depicting themes related to theatre and one of the most important testimonies to the Flavians, like the paintings of Pompeii and Herculaneum.

Some rooms date back to the age of Hadrian, which witness the continuity of use at least until completion of Villa Adriana in Tivoli.

The "Hippodrome"
It was not possible to establish the length because the wall to the south is not known.

However it has been shown to be a garden from the water cisterns and decoration, similar to that of Domitian's palace on the Palatine.

Remains on the shore of the lake

The Nymphaea
The two nymphaea (Doric and Bergantino) on the shore of the lake are fascinating and mysterious structures. The Doric nymphaeum was probably rediscovered in 1723, since it is in a memoire of Francesco de Ficoroni (the discoverer of the famous Cista Ficoroni).

The Doric nymphaeum

The beautiful Doric nymphaeum on the descent from Castel Gandolfo towards the lake is dated to the Republican age. It has similarities to that at Caffarella. The function of this structure remains obscure but the nymphaeum was a Doric temple perhaps built on the site of ancient Alba Longa.

The order of the first floor columns is Doric (hence the name of the fountain), that of the second Ionic. At the centre in front of the entrance is an arch leading into a natural cave, probably an ancient spring.

Many scholars believe that it could be the “sacella” (sacrarium) described by Cicero and built by Clodius on the ruins of the ancient Alba Longa.  The Nymphaeum is faced with opus reticulatum.
 
There used to be spectacular water works with larger and smaller waterfalls and channels fed with water from one of the aqueducts and from a series of cisterns and pipes installed behind the central back wall.

The Bergantino nymphaeum
On the western shore of Lake Albano, 2 km after the Doric nymphaeum is a circular cave of  diameter. A pool is in the middle of the cave, and the floor was completely covered with mosaics, of which a few fragments remain.

Various parts of sculptural groups found in the nymphaeum are now kept at the Pontifical Palace in Castel Gandolfo

The docks
The first comprehensive study on the docks and neighbouring buildings was completed in 1919 by Lugli and Thomas Ashby. The two eminent scholars explored the lake not only on foot, sometimes wading into the water, but also by aerial survey on board an airship.

Their conclusion was that the shore was a collection of docks of several private villas or structures of different ages. In particular, the docks are concentrated on the western and eastern shore, while  similar structures are not present on the southern bank or to the north.

The eastern shore begins at the town of Cantone and ends in the locality of Acqua Acetosa. Here Lugli and Ashby found remains of three adjacent villas dating back to the first century, each with its direct flight of steps to the lake.

The western shore starts at the junction of the 140 road to the beach at Castel Gandolfo and continues to the Bergantino nymphaeum at the rowing stadium for the 1960 Olympic Games in Rome. On this stretch are the most monumental remains including a cryptoporticus probably related to a villa, and a structure known as a beacon or lighthouse. The first part of the shore at the Doric nymphaeum is dated to the late Republican era, and one or two villas can be recognised which were subsequently incorporated into the Domitian complex.

The rotonda

This unique building has a cylindrical plan within a cube, similar but smaller to the Pantheon in Rome, also replicating the oculus (central hole). Its diameter is 16 m and the whole structure is made of opus mixtum.

It is unclear why Domitian had this built so far from the residential complex of his villa. In the past it was believed to be a temple dedicated to Minerva and the Sun and the Moon, but Lugli objected that its plan was not of a typical Roman temple, and he therefore believed it was an isolated nymphaeum, a view shared by many today.

In the Severan era this structure was incorporated into the perimeter wall of the Castra Albana and adapted for bathing by legionaries: to this phase belong the floor mosaics and the rectangular entrance front. Probably between the ninth and tenth century it was converted into a place of worship, and received the Eastern image of the Madonna dating from the 6th - 7th century.

Water supply

The aqueducts
The complex of Domitian's Villa is supplied from the southeast by four aqueducts coming from sources located between the towns of Palazzolo and Malafitto. In many places, ancient aqueducts still feed modern ones or have been in use until a few decades ago.

The aqueduct disappears at the height of the old town of Albano, about 3 m below the ground in Piazza San Paolo. It is very likely that this served originally the villa of Pompey. In the Severan age it must have also served the Castra Albana as the great "Cisternoni" of  the thermae are adjacent to the Rotunda and the Baths of Caracalla.

Two aqueducts have sources near Malafitto, called "high" and "low Malafitto" depending on the height at which they run. The high Malafitto aqueduct is the only one of the four definitely attributable to the Domitian era. The aqueduct had to serve the whole of the villa building, and to maintain a high flow,  the builders had to follow a rather tortuous path through the woods of Selvotta. Finally the aqueduct passed under the Colle dei Cappuccini and ran in a section parallel to the other two aqueducts. From there, the tunnel emptied into the great cistern of the villa under the seat of Propaganda Fide. The tunnels not carved into the rock are made of opus reticulatum. The channel is approximately 60 cm wide and about 1.60 m tall.

The low Malafitto has more opus reticulatum and different channel dimensions that suggest a period immediately subsequent to the Flavian, presumably Trajan or Hadrian. Its route runs almost parallel to the others to the cemetery of Albano but then heads towards the current town of Castel Gandolfo and it seems certain that it leads to the large Torlonia cistern in the dell'Ercolano area. Lugli ruled it out as a service aqueduct of the oldest villa of Clodius but considers it possible that the route may have been rearranged and extended to the Torlonia cistern in the second century to serve the new part of the imperial possessions. He also believes that there was a direct water supply arm to the Roman amphitheatre of Albano Laziale, built with the construction of the Castra Albana.

Finally, the aqueduct of Aqua Augusta was identified in 1872 by Giovanni Battista de Rossi due to five memorial stones found in different properties between the Fields of Hannibal at Rocca di Papa, and the slopes of Monte Cavo. The only possible hypothesis is that it served the Roman villa identified on the shores of Lake Albano in Palazzolo, attributed to Augustus by the 19th c. archaeologists.

The garrison

Later history

Abandonment
The African Emperor Septimius Severus built the grandiose structures of the garrison of Castra Albana in 197 AD on the edge of the imperial properties for his loyal veterans of Legio II Parthica. However, decline of the villa also began at this time.

The Parthian legionaries and their families established around the camp began to plunder the villa structures in order to use the material for new construction, thus giving rise to the village that would later become Albano Laziale. A second town developed on the northern edge of the imperial properties: in the Middle Ages it was called Cuccurutus and gave rise to the village Castel Gandolfo.

The Liber Pontificalis records the donation of virtually all imperial property, and much of the surrounding area, to the cathedral of St. John the Baptist (identified with the Cathedral of Albano, now named after the martyr Saint Pancras), made under Pope Sylvester I (314 - 335 AD) by Emperor Constantine I.

We do not know if this donation was real or not, but certainly the imperial villa of Albanum was abandoned.

Around the tenth century an ancient nymphaeum of the villa, integrated in the Severan era with the thermal baths of Castra Albana, was consecrated to religious use as sanctuary of Santa Maria della Rotonda, today a revered place of worship of Albano, and known as "la Rotonda".

The villa became the quarry of marble and building materials, similar to that of other ancient buildings: we know for sure that its marbles were used to build and coat the Cathedral of Orvieto in the fourteenth century.

The then feudal lords, the Savelli, gave permission to dismantle the facilities of the villa in 1321: the destruction lasted 36 days. The documents of the time outline a real business behind the dismantling of these monuments: Rodolfo Lanciani drew inspiration from these careful studies of smoke to obtain an exemplum on the reuse of the immense marble and stone material of ancient monuments of Rome and its surroundings.

Rediscovery
Giuseppe Lugli (1890–1967) was an eminent Italian archaeologist of the twentieth century. He graduated in 1913 with a thesis on the Alban villa of Domitian, and subsequently enriched, corrected and completed his studies about until 1922, publishing four volumes which, with his topographic surveys, are still the main source of information on the villa.

In 1919 he made the first archaeological survey aboard the airship "Roma ", accompanied by the director of the British School of Rome, Thomas Ashby.

Pope Urban VIII ( 1623–1644 ) was the first pontiff to holiday in Castel Gandolfo, the Papal Palace; his nephew Taddeo Barberini bought the villa in 1631 which had belonged to Scipione Visconti, and which contained the most significant contents of Domitian's Villa.

The most striking views of the ruins overgrown by vegetation, such as the cryptoporticus and nymphaeum, were described by scholars and diarists from the 15th c. onwards and reproduced in engravings and paintings.

In 1929 the Lateran Treaty recognised the 55 hectares of the Pontifical Villas of Castel Gandolfo between the extraterritorial zone of the Holy See in Italy: most of the ruins of the villa became part of the Vatican City State, thanks to the sale of Villa Barberini to the Holy See, historically linked to the papal complex, but until then alien to it.

The Pontifical Villas were subjected to a radical reorganization at the behest of Pope Pius XI and even the archaeological inventories, such as the cryptoporticus and the road of the nymphaeum, were cleaned and incorporated.

References

Other references
 ALBANUM AND THE VILLAS OF DOMITIAN;Robin DARWALL-SMITH;Pallas No. 40, Les annêes Domitien: Presses Universitaires du Midi, https://www.jstor.org/stable/43660537

Do
Domitian
Alba Longa
Buildings and structures in Castel Gandolfo
Buildings and structures in Albano Laziale